The Brazilian Dental Journal is a bimonthly peer-reviewed medical journal covering all aspects of dentistry. It is abstracted and indexed in MEDLINE/PubMed. The publication of this journal is financially supported by the Fundação Odontológica de Ribeirão Preto da Faculdade de Odontologia de Ribeirão Preto da Universidade de São Paulo, the Programa de Apoio a Publicações Científicas do Conselho Nacional de Desenvolvimento Científico e Tecnológico,> the Ministério da Ciência e Tecnologia (MCT), Financiadora de Estudos e Projetos, and the Fundação de Amparo à Pesquisa do Estado de São Paulo. The editors-in-chief are Jesus Djalma Pécora, Paulo Cesar Saquy, and Manoel Damião de Sousa Neto.

External links

Dentistry journals
English-language journals
Bimonthly journals
Publications established in 1990